The Kowloon East geographical constituency is one of the ten geographical constituencies in the elections for the Legislative Council of Hong Kong which elects two members of the Legislative Council using the single non-transferable vote (SNTV) system. The constituency covers Kwun Tong District and south-eastern part of Wong Tai Sin District in Kowloon.

History
The constituency was created under the overhaul of the electoral system imposed by the Beijing government in 2021, replacing the Kwun Tong District and south-eastern part of Wong Tai Sin District (Choi Wan East, Choi Wan South, Choi Wan West, Chi Choi, Choi Hung) of the Kowloon East constituency used from 1998 to 2021. Constituencies with the same name were also created for the 1991 and 1995 elections in the late colonial period, while the 1991 constituency also elected two seats with each voter having two votes.

Returning members

Election results

2020s

References 

Constituencies of Hong Kong
Kowloon
Constituencies of Hong Kong Legislative Council
2021 establishments in Hong Kong
Constituencies established in 2021